This article features the 1996 UEFA European Under-18 Championship qualifying stage. Matches were played 1995 through 1996. Two qualifying rounds were organised and seven teams qualified for the main tournament, joining host France.

Round 1

Group 1
All matches were played in Austria.

Group 2

Group 3

Group 4

Group 5
All matches were played in Israel.

Group 6
All matches were played in Germany.

Group 7
All matches were played in Belgium.

Group 8
All matches were played in Denmark.

Group 9
All matches were played in the Netherlands.

Group 10
All matches were played in Slovakia.

Group 11
All matches were played in Poland.

Group 12
All matches were played in Lithuania.

Group 13
All matches were played in England.

Group 14

Group 15
All matches were played in Northern Ireland.

Round 2

Group 1

Groups 2-7

|}

See also
 1996 UEFA European Under-18 Championship

External links
Results by RSSSF

UEFA European Under-19 Championship qualification
Qual